This list of botanical gardens and arboretums in New Mexico is intended to include all significant botanical gardens and arboretums in the U.S. state of New Mexico

See also
List of botanical gardens and arboretums in the United States

References 

 
Arboreta in New Mexico
botanical gardens and arboretums in New Mexico